The Riich G5 is a Mid-size car manufactured by the Riich division of the Chinese company Chery Automobile from 2009 to 2013. It was unveiled for the first time at the 2009 Shanghai Auto Show.

Features

The engine also features an intercooler and meets the Euro IV emission standards.

It offers front, side and curtain airbags, ABS, EBD, ESP, rear parking sensors, dual zone automatic air conditioning and a digital touchscreen display featuring navigation and DVD player functions. Other additional features are xenon headlights with headlight washers, tyre pressure monitoring system, electric-adjustable backrests, rear DVD screens and cruise control.

References

External links

G5
Mid-size cars
Cars of China
Cars introduced in 2009
2010s cars